Ketan Rahangdale is an American entrepreneur and the CEO of the startup company, EarTop Technologies.  He is the youngest person on the Empact 100 list in 2012.

Education
Ketan Rahangdale graduated from Lawton Chiles High School in Tallahassee, Florida in 2011, where he played tennis. He attended Babson College’s entrepreneurship program as a freshman, later transferring to University of Miami to be closer to his business partners.  He is a member of the Launch Pad, the University of Miami’s entrepreneurship program.

Career
Rahangdale began DJing at parties and concerts at age 12. He decided to create wireless headphones and replace audio cables to make it easier for DJs to set up and maneuver. Rahangdale began pitching his idea at elevator and business pitch competitions:  He was a semi-finalist at the Massachusetts Institute of Technology’s Elevator Pitch Competition and a 2012 ACC Startup Madness finalist.
   
Rahangdale raised $250,000 in angel funding and partnered with an engineering firm in Orlando, Florida to create the product. He and his business partners named the startup company “EarTop.”  EarTop was started in Tallahassee, Florida in August 2011 and legally formed in January 2012. 

After exiting EarTop at the age of 20, he co-founded JOOX Music as CEO, a Social Music Community.

Awards
The Startup America Partnership and Empact named Ketan Rahangdale to their Empact 100 list, which is a group of entrepreneurs under the age of 30.  Rahangdale was included in a White House ceremony for the Empact 100, and is the only CEO on the list under the age of 20.

Additionally, Rahangdale won the Kairos 50 award in 2012 & 2013, which recognizes business ventures by university students. He was also a finalist in the Technology Leaders of the Year Awards for 2012 in the Technology Student Entrepreneur category, an award given by the Greater Miami Chamber of Commerce.

Memberships
Rahangdale is a member of the Kairos Society and President of the Southeast Region. He is also a member of the Young Entrepreneur Council of America.

References

Babson College alumni
Living people
American technology chief executives
University of Miami alumni
University of Central Florida alumni
1992 births